The Pyzh is a small river in Perm Krai, Russia, that flows through the city of Perm and nearby Permsky District and is the longest left tributary of the Mulyanka. The Pyzh forms part of the border of Perm.

The Pyzh is subject to pollution with industrial waste of JSC "LUKOIL-Permnefteorgsintez".

References

Rivers of Perm Krai